Il était une fois... les Découvreurs (English, Once Upon a Time... The Discoverers) is a French animated TV series from 1994, as part of the Once Upon a Time... franchise. It was directed by Albert Barillé. The show aired in the United States on the History Channel starting in April 1995.

Episodes
The Chinese, our Ancestors
Archimedes and the Greek
Hero of Alexandria
The Measuring of Time
Henry the Navigator, Vasco da Gama and Cartography
Gutenberg and Printing
Leonardo da Vinci, a Jack-of-all-trades
The Doctors (Paracelsus, Andreas Vesalius, Ambroise Paré, etc.)
Galileo Galilei
Isaac Newton
Georges-Louis Leclerc, Comte de Buffon (Discovering the Past)
Antoine Lavoisier and Chemistry
George Stephenson, Full Steam Ahead!
Michael Faraday and Electricity
Charles Darwin and Evolution
Gregor Mendel and Peas
Louis Pasteur and Micro-organisms
Thomas Edison and Applied Science
Guglielmo Marconi and Sound Waves
Henry Ford and the Adventure of Motorcar
Aviation (Otto Lilienthal, Wright brothers, etc.)
Marie Curie
Albert Einstein
Konrad Lorenz, Father of the Geese
Neil Armstrong, the Moon and the Space
Tomorrow?

Broadcast information

* Contributing co-producer

See also
 List of French animated television series

References

External links
Official website for Procidis, the series' producer

 Hello Mastero at YouTube

1994 French television series debuts
1994 French television series endings
1990s French animated television series
French children's animated education television series
Historical television series
Television series set in ancient history
Television series set in the Renaissance
Television series set in the 15th century
Television series set in the 16th century
Television series set in the 17th century
Television series set in the 18th century
Television series set in the 19th century
Television series set in the 20th century
Canal+ original programming
Cultural depictions of Archimedes
Cultural depictions of Johannes Gutenberg
Cultural depictions of Vasco da Gama
Cultural depictions of Leonardo da Vinci
Cultural depictions of Isaac Newton
Cultural depictions of Charles Darwin
Cultural depictions of Louis Pasteur
Cultural depictions of Thomas Edison
Cultural depictions of Marie Curie
Cultural depictions of the Wright brothers
Cultural depictions of Henry Ford
Cultural depictions of Albert Einstein
Cultural depictions of Neil Armstrong